Newmarket railway station serves the town of Newmarket, in Suffolk, England. All trains serving it are operated by  Abellio owned Greater Anglia. Following the sale of the station building for offices by Network Rail in 2011, plans were underway to build a new station building following complaints from local residents. Some improvements were made in 2016.

The first railway station in Newmarket opened in 1848 as the terminus of the Newmarket and Chesterford Railway. This station was extended with a new island platform and opened along with the new Newmarket to Ely line in 1879. Newmarket Warren Hill station, built by the Great Eastern Railway specifically for race traffic, opened six years later and closing just after the Second World War. The original station was replaced by a new structure in 1902 and a much reduced facility on this site remains in use today.

History

Newmarket (1848 station)

Description
The line was extended by the Eastern Counties Railway eastwards to Bury St Edmunds on 1 April 1854, but trains had to reverse in or out of the station.

Sir Nickolaus Pevsner described the station thus: "was one of the most sumptuously Baroque stations of the early Victorian decades in England. Seven bays, one story divided by coupled Ionic giant columns carrying protected pieces of entablature and big chunks of decorated attic."

History
The line between Cambridge and Newmarket was doubled in 1875.

An additional island platform was opened on 1 September 1879 for general traffic located on the direct Ipswich - Cambridge line. This meant that through trains no longer had to reverse in and out of the original station and the original terminus station was then used for race day traffic and any Newmarket - Cambridge services. At the north end a footbridge linked the terminal platform and the new platforms (which were at a slightly lower level) and these remained open until replaced in 1902 by a new station to the south.

The former terminus became known as Newmarket (High Level).

The new platforms were located just south of the 1,100 yard Warren Hill tunnel  and lasted until 1902 when the new station opened (see below).

The island platform survived disused for a number of years and pictorial evidence from the 1900s shows the surface was partly broken up and flowerbeds created. The platform was removed sometime in the 1930s to enable the main line to be re-aligned so more siding space could be created at the old terminus site.

An additional platform at the terminus station (known as the third class platform) was opened in 1885 to cope with additional raceday traffic. Opening the same year as Newmarket Warren Hill station the old station site dealt with race traffic from the south and London whilst Warren Hill dealt with traffic from the north and east.

During World War I the terminus station building was used as a temporary hospital.

Race day traffic ceased using the terminus platforms in July 1954.

Goods traffic at the old terminus station remained vibrant until the 1960s. Records from 1960 show that, caravans (the Sprite model produced by Newmarket firm Caravans International), agricultural implements, fertilizers and barley left the station and much paper imported from the USA was received. Horse traffic amounted to 1,073 sent and 1.573 received.

On 21 February 1967 the last shunting horse to work on British Rail, "Charlie" at Newmarket retired with goods traffic being withdrawn from Newmarket the same year.

The track was lifted in February 1969. The main station building received grade 2 listing but fell into a state of disrepair. It and the remaining buildings on the site  were demolished in 1980 and the site is now occupied by a housing estate.

Engine shed
A turntable was provided at Newmarket for turning locomotives and in the early 1880s the GER provided a timber engine shed and inspection pit at this location. The LNER installed a 60-foot turntable in the 1920s primarily for visiting locomotives on race day traffic rather than Newmarket's allocated shunting locomotive. The dilapidated shed was demolished during the 1930s although the inspection pit, turntable and water tower remained until closure.

The stables housing the shunting horses were located close to the water tower.

Newmarket Warren Hill
Newmarket Warren Hill station  was built by the Great Eastern Railway. It opened on 4 April 1885 just to the north of Warren Hill Tunnel and catered for racecourse-goers arriving from points north, particularly Lincoln, Leeds and Manchester, with the encouragement of the Jockey Club. Warren Hill was closed by the London and North Eastern Railway some time in or after 1945 but before 1 January 1948, when British Railways was formed.

Description
Warren Hill station was a terminus station built alongside the Ipswich to Cambridge line but not served by it. The station consisted of a single island platform with two platform roads and a number of sidings and loops (for locomotives to run round their carriages).

Entrance to the station was by a four way covered staircase leading down to a covered (in glass and corrugated iron) arcade area. The arcade area, whilst not luxuriously equipped, had a refreshment bar, Ladies waiting room and toilets as well as various railway offices.
The platform was 510 feet long but had no shelter (presumably passengers waited in the covered area until their train was shunted into the platform).

History
During the 1870s and 1880s more and more people were coming to the races at Newmarket. The opening of the Newmarket - Ely line in 1879 meant that trains from the north could get to Newmarket more easily rather than having to reverse at Cambridge and line of the first trains to use the new link was a train carrying racehorses from Newmarket to Doncaster.

In April 1883 the GER approved a quote (by builders Messrs Bennett Bros. of Downham Market) and work commenced on clearing a space north of the Ipswich to Cambridge line at the east end of Warren Hill tunnel. Although the building was delayed by inclement weather the station was ready for the 1885 "Craven" meeting at Newmarket Racecourse on 20 April. After this point, the old 1848 station dealt with traffic from London and the west whilst Warren Hill accommodated traffic from the north and east.

Warren Hill remained busy with racing traffic up to World War I where it was put into military use.

After the war racing day traffic returned to the station.

Following the Railways Act 1921 Warren Hill station was operated by the London and North Eastern Railway from 1 January 1923.

During the 1930s numbers using the station declined and the last train ran in October 1938.

Between 1939 and 1945 the station again saw military use and then after the war at some point between 1945 and 1948 the station was formally closed to passengers although saw goods and engineering traffic for a number of years. The sidings at Warren Hill were removed in the early 1960s although the platform remained until the 1980s.

Newmarket (1902 station)

Newmarket (Suffolk) railway station was opened by the Great Eastern Railway on 7 April 1902. Since March 2013, passenger services have been operated by Abellio Greater Anglia.

Notes

References

External links 

Newmarket
Newmarket
Newmarket, Suffolk